Ishtar is a Mesopotamian deity.

Ishtar may also refer to:

Architecture 

 Ishtar Gate, a gate to the inner city of ancient Babylon, and a smaller gate reconstructed in the Pergamon Museum in the 1930s

Astronomy 

 7088 Ishtar, a binary near-Earth asteroid
 Ishtar Terra, an area on the planet Venus

Arts, entertainment, and media 

 Ishtar TV, Iraqi broadcasting company
 Ishtar (singer), French-Israeli pop singer and vocalist
 Ishtar (band), a Belgian folk band
 Ishtar (film), a 1987 film written and directed by Elaine May
 Ishtar, a fictional planet in Poul Anderson's novel Fire Time
 Ishtar, a character in the game series The Tower of Druaga
 Ishtar, a character in the anime Macross II
 Ishtar, the main character of the manga Vampire Game
 Ishtar, a character in the anime Fate/Grand Order - Absolute Demonic Front: Babylonia